Langya henipavirus (LayV), also known as Langya virus, is a species of henipavirus first detected in the Chinese provinces of Shandong and Henan.
It has been announced in 35 patients from 2018 to August 2022. All but 9 of the 35 cases in China were infected with LayV only, with the symptoms including fever, fatigue, and cough. No deaths due to LayV have been reported . Langya henipavirus affects species including humans, dogs, goats, and its presumed original host, shrews. The 35 cases were not in contact with each other, and it is not known  if the virus is capable of human-to-human transmission.

Etymology
The name of the virus in Simplified Chinese refers to Langya Commandery, a historical commandery in present-day Shandong, China.

Classification
Langya henipavirus is classified as a henipavirus in the family Paramyxoviridae. Its closest relative, the Mojiang henipavirus, is the only other henipavirus not to be found primarily in bats. It is also closely related to the Nipah virus and the Hendra virus.

Symptoms 
Of the 35 people infected with the virus, 26 were identified as not showing signs of another infection. They all experienced fever, with fatigue being the second most common symptom. Coughing, muscle pains, nausea, headaches and vomiting were also reported as symptoms of infection.

More than half of the infectees had leukopenia, and more than a third had thrombocytopenia, with a smaller number being reported to have impaired liver or kidney function.

Transmission 
The researchers who identified the virus found LayV antibodies in a few goats and dogs, and identified LayV viral RNA in 27% of the 262 shrews they sampled. They found no strong evidence of the virus spreading between people. One researcher commented in the NEJM that henipaviruses do not typically spread between people, and thus LayV would be unlikely to become a pandemic, stating: "The only henipavirus that has showed some sign of human-to-human transmission is the Nipah virus and that requires very close contact. I don't think this has much pandemic potential." Another researcher noted that LayV is most likely not transmitted from person to person easily, and that the most likely source of a future pandemic would be a virus that "jumps" from animals to humans.

Control measures
The Taiwan Centers for Disease Control said in August 2022 that they would establish a nucleic acid testing method to identify the virus and strengthen surveillance.

References

External links
 (Chinese) 中国新发现一种与人类发热性疾病相关的动物源性亨尼帕病毒 New England Journal of Medicine

Henipavirus
Viral respiratory tract infections
Zoonoses
Public health
Disease outbreaks in China
2018 in China
2022 in China